Sneha Limbu is a Hong Kong professional footballer who plays as a forward for Hong Kong Women League club Citizen AA and the Hong Kong women's national team.

Club career
Limbu has played for Citizen AA in Hong Kong.

International career
Limbu represented Hong Kong at the 2019 AFC U-16 Women's Championship qualification and the 2020 Turkish Women's Cup.

International goals
Scores and results list Hong Kong's goal tally first

References

2000s births
Living people
People from Kowloon
Hong Kong women's footballers
Women's association football forwards
Hong Kong women's international footballers
Hong Kong people of Nepalese descent